Cristian w/o H, known by his one-man music project DIGITALIS PURPUREA and also known as Cris Gutter, is an Italian multi-instrumentalist sound artist. 
He works as a professional sound technician for dubbing and broadcasting, for which he has curated much production in the advertising and corporate areas.
Furthermore, he has curated the sound design of exhibitions and plays.
His musical creations are a mixture of Industrial, Electronica, Glam, Giallo, Conceptual Noise and Horror Themes.
He is signed to Danse Macabre Records and Aural Music Group. 
After a successful audio experimentation with Digitech products, he currently is an official endorser artist.
He worldwide released four full-length albums including "30-hole and Fred Perry" which reached the TOP-10 spot on the DAC - Deutsche Alternative Charts. He also played in major international festivals and clubs such as WAVE GOTIK TREFFEN, SLIMELIGHT UK and DARK MUNICH FESTIVAL. 
Musically involved in notable productions and unconventional collaborations, he worked with top-artists, producers and engineers such as Ted Jensen, Danny Saber, Matthew Setzer (Skinny Puppy, London After Midnight), Bruno Kramm (Das Ich), Madaski, Fabri Fibra and many others.
His photo shoots titled “Planet of the Velvet Samurai” and "Om Pop Model From Ygam" have been published in the key American fashion journal "Dark Beauty Magazine".
In 2016 he worldwide released the EP "Pastel Dissonances" in digital format. Its first single "The Mesmeric Lights Of Vegas" is also a videoclip and credits Cristian as its creative director, producer and protagonist. The song has been included in Zvuková Vlna XII, a compilation dedicated to Italian contemporary artists, produced by Istituto Italiano di Cultura Bratislava. 
In 2018 he released the maxi-single "Maneater" produced by Keith Hillebrandt (Nine Inch Nails, David Bowie, 12 Rounds) and Fabrizio Giannese (Aborym). It has been included in "Quid" soundtrack, a film by Valerio Di Lorenzo. 
During the same year, he has been part of "You Die" film production as musician. The film has been selected for "Screamfest Horror Film Festival" in Los Angeles.

Discography
2003 – Pi Squad - Demo Cd, Crypto Records
2004 – 19 Celebrations in 19 Mutilations - EP Crypto Records
2008 – Aseptic White - Full-length, "Dreamcell_11/Aural Music"
2010 – Emotional Decompression Chamber - Full-length, "Dreamcell_11/Aural Music"
2012 – 30-hole and Fred Perry - EP, "Danse Macabre Records (Germany)"
2014 – Palindrome Shapes of Mold - Full-length, "Danse Macabre Records (Germany)"
2016 - Pastel Dissonances – EP, "Subalpina Industry"
2017 - AnnA (La sua bellezza trasfigurata attraverso un bicchiere di J&B) – Full-length, "Subalpina Industry"
2017 - Intervallo – EP, "Subalpina Industry"
2018 - Maneater (Industrial Rock Version) – Single, "Subalpina Industry"

Contributions and remixes
2005 – IBM (Italian Body Music) Vol.2 
2007 – Gears of Industry (split cd) 
2010 – Fuck 'em All Vol.7 
2011 – The Bizarre Remixes (split cd w/No Forgiveness) 
2012 – Sonic Seducer _ Cold Hands Seduction Vol.130
2013 – Dunkle Frequenzen Vol.01
2013 – Die Antwoord vs Digitalis Purpurea _Dis Iz Why I'm Hot (BitBabol Mixxx)
2013 – Helalyn Flowers _White Me in Black Me Out [REMIX / Alfa Matrix]
2013 – TheDubSync P.O.T. feat Fabri Fibra [REMIX / Elastica Records]
2015 – Face The Beat: Session 3 [Side-Line Magazine]
2016 – Zvuková Vlna XII

Notes

External links

– official Instagram 
Digitalis Purpurea– official SoundCloud 

Musical groups established in 2000
Electro-industrial music groups
Italian industrial metal musical groups
Italian industrial rock musical groups
Italian alternative rock groups